MŠK Novohrad Lučenec is a Slovak football team, based in the city of Lučenec.

Notable players
Had international caps for their respective countries. Players whose name is listed in bold represented their countries while playing for Lučenec.

Past (and present) players who are the subjects of Wikipedia articles can be found here.

 Pavol Diňa
 Róbert Semeník
 Dušan Sninský
 Július Šimon

Notable managers

 Vladimír Rusnák (2005–08)
 Milan Albrecht (2008–10)
 Jozef Škrlík (2010–11)
 Stanislav Lieskovský (2011–13)
 Tomáš Boháčik 2013-16
 János Viszteleki 2016-18
 Andrej Kamendy 2018
 Csaba Tóth 2018-19
 Miroslav Kéry 2019 -

References

External links
Futbalnet profile 
 

 
Football clubs in Slovakia
Football clubs in Hungary
Association football clubs established in 1902
1902 establishments in Slovakia